Hai Tanahku Papua ("Oh My Land Papua") was an anthem of Netherlands New Guinea and of the unilaterally declared Republic of West Papua.

History
The anthem was composed by the Dutch missionary Rev. Izaak Samuel Kijne during the 1930s.

After the Dutch-supervised election of a regional parliament, the New Guinea Council, a group was formed on 19 October 1961 to elect a national committee. The committee drafted a manifesto for independence and self-government, a national flag (the Morning Star Flag), state seal, selected "Hai Tanahku Papua" as a national anthem, and called for the people to be known as Papuans. The New Guinea Council voted unanimously in favour of these proposals on 30 October 1961, and on 31 October 1961 presented the Morning Star flag and manifesto to Governor-General Pieter Johannes Platteel. The Dutch recognized the flag and anthem on 18 November 1961 (Government Gazettes of Dutch New Guinea No. 68 & 69), and these ordinances came into effect on 1 December 1961. The anthem went out of public use after Operation Trikora and handover of West Papua to Indonesia in 1963.

Current status
The anthem is currently a prominent symbol of independence activists, including Organisasi Papua Merdeka (Free Papua Movement), and use of the anthem within the province is prohibited. The song has also been proposed as a symbol of the province of Papua.

Lyrics

See also

Free Papua Movement

References

External links

Hai Tanahku Papua, with lyrics and music file

Patriotic songs
Historical national anthems
Western New Guinea
Asian anthems
Oceanian anthems
1930s songs
Year of song missing